Rescue archaeology, sometimes called commercial archaeology, preventive archaeology, salvage archaeology, contract archaeology, developer-funded archaeology or compliance archaeology, is state-sanctioned, archaeological survey and excavation carried out in advance of construction or other land development. Other causes for salvage digs can be looting and illegal construction. One effect of 
rescue archaeology is that it diverts resources and impacts pre-planned archaeological work.

Conditions leading to rescue archaeology could include, but are not limited to, highway projects, major construction, the flood plain of a proposed dam, or even before the onset of war. Unlike traditional survey and excavation, rescue archaeology must be undertaken at speed. Rescue archaeology is included in the broader categories that are cultural resource management (CRM) and cultural heritage management (CHM).

Background
Rescue archaeology occurs on sites about to be destroyed but, on occasion, may include in situ preservation of any finds or protective measures taken to preserve an unexcavated site beneath a building. Urban areas with many overlaid years of habitation are often candidates for rescue archaeology.

The focus of early work was to set up organisations to undertake rescue excavations shortly before an area was disturbed by construction equipment. Archaeologists relied on the goodwill of the developer to provide the opportunity to record remains. In more recent use, an archaeological survey may be required by planning process or building law, as with the National Planning Policy Framework (NPPF) in the United Kingdom and NPPG5 in Scotland. Common conditions required by planning authorities are archaeological field survey, watching briefs, shovel test pits, trial trenching, and excavation. Guidance and standards of practice in the UK are largely monitored through the Chartered Institute for Archaeologists (CIfA).

Contract or commercial archaeology services have sprung up to meet the needs of developers and to comply with local laws and planning regulations. In the United Kingdom, over 3000 archaeologists are employed in commercial archaeology.

For many years, the emphasis was on archaeological evidence in the ground. However, with increased interest in industrial archaeology, rescue archaeology needs to commence by recording extant remains of buildings i.e. prior to demolition.

Regionality and terminology
The term, and indeed the practice of, is largely restricted to North America, South America, Western Europe, and East Asia, especially the United States, Canada, the United Kingdom, Korea, and Japan. Many European countries, such as, e.g., Germany, practice virtually no rescue excavation (though there is extensive research archaeology). The many rescue archaeology projects in the Middle East are generally termed salvage archaeology.

In North America, commercial archaeology sometimes refers to the study of structures and artifacts created in connection with popular commercial activity, such as diners, motels, gasoline stations, and signs. Special focus is given to commerce and transportation, the effects of market economy and the use of space, and the development of roadside businesses.

Two terms used in the context of rescue archaeology are rescue excavation and rescue dig.

Salvage excavation is a term used in North America. Another related term is salvage dig.

As a profession

Whereas the organizations that take on rescue archaeology contracts are stable entities, the archaeologists who perform the actual field work are, in the main, an army of mobile workers. They work in all types of weather and terrain covering tasks such as conservation, excavation, artifact curation, field survey often in difficult conditions (such as dense woodland), and typically working to tight deadlines. Given that the outputs of much of the work that is undertaken in advance of development work is not published in peer reviewed journals, the people that perform the actual research are often anonymous and unrecognized.

"Shovelbum" is a play on one of the more polite names which professional archaeologists call each other when they enter the field of rescue archaeology and move from excavation to excavation. As much archaeology is now developer-led, the fieldworkers must move to where the work is when one contract is complete, much like ski-bums following the good snow fall. For professional field archaeologists the Shovelbum phase of a career is considered by some a rite of passage.

See also
Cultural Heritage Management
Cultural Resources Management
Garbology, the study of modern refuse and trash
Rescue (British Archaeological Trust)
Shovelbum
Valletta Treaty

References

Further reading

American Cultural Resources Association. 2013. The Cultural Resources Management Industry: Providing Critical Support for Building Our Nation’s Infrastructure through Expertise in Historic Preservation. Electronic document. 
Everill, Paul. 2009. The Invisible Diggers: A Study of British Commercial Archaeology. Oxbow Books. 
Hutchings, Rich. 2014. "The Miner’s Canary"—What the Maritime Heritage Crisis Says About Archaeology, Cultural Resource Management, and Global Ecological Breakdown. Unpublished PhD dissertation, Interdisciplinary Studies, University of British Columbia. 
Hutchings, Rich and Marina La Salle. 2012. Five Thoughts on Commercial Archaeology. Electronic document. 
Hutchings, Rich and Marina La Salle. 2015. Archaeology as Disaster Capitalism. International Journal of Historical Archaeology [Forthcoming] 
King, Thomas F. 2012. Cultural Resource Laws and Practice: An Introductory Guide (4th Edition). Altamira Press. 
King, Thomas F. 2009. Our Unprotected Heritage: Whitewashing the Destruction of Our Cultural and Natural Environment. Left Coast Press. 
King, Thomas F. 2005. Doing Archaeology: A Cultural Resource Management Perspective. Left Coast Press. 
La Salle, Marina and Rich Hutchings. 2012. Commercial Archaeology in British Columbia. The Midden 44(2): 8-16. 
Neumann, Thomas W. and Robert M. Sanford. 2010. Cultural Resources Archaeology: An Introduction (2nd Edition). Rowman and Littlefield. 
Lavachery, P., MacEachern, S., Bouimon, T. & Mbida Mindzie, C. 2010. Komé-Kribi. Rescue Archaeology along the Chad-Cameroon Oil Pipeline, 1999-2004. Africa Magna, Frankfurt a. M.
Neumann, Thomas W. and Robert M. Sanford. 2010. Practicing Archaeology: A Training Manual for Cultural Resources Archaeology (2nd Edition). Rowman and Littlefield. 
Nissley, Claudia and Thomas F. King. 2014. Consultation and Cultural Heritage: Let Us Reason Together. Left Coast Press. 
Smith, Laurajane. 2004. Archaeological Theory and Politics of Cultural Heritage. Routledge. 
Smith, Laurajane. 2001. Archaeology and the Governance of Material Culture: A Case Study from South-Eastern Australia. Norwegian Archaeological Review 34(2): 97-105. 
Smith, Laurajane. 2000. A History of Aboriginal Heritage Legislation in South-Eastern Australia. Australian Archaeology 50: 109-118. 
Stapp, Darby and Julia J. Longenecker. 2009. Avoiding Archaeological Disasters: A Risk Management Approach. Left Coast Press. 
White, Gregory G. and Thomas F. King. 2007. The Archaeological Survey Manual. Left Coast Press. 
Zorzin, Nicolas. 2014. Heritage Management and Aboriginal Australians: Relations in a Global, Neoliberal Economy—A Contemporary Case Study from Victoria. Archaeologies: The Journal of the World Archaeological Congress 10(2): 132-167. 
Zorzin, Nicolas. 2011. Contextualising Contract Archaeology in Quebec: Political Economy and Economic Dependencies. Archaeological Review from Cambridge 26(1): 119-135. 
Zorzin, Nicolas. 2010. The Political Economy of a Commercial Archaeology: A Quebec Case-Study. Unpublished PhD dissertation, Faculty of Humanities (Archaeology), University of Southampton. 
 Parga Dans, Eva and Pablo Alonso Gonzalez. 2020. The Unethical Enterprise of the Past: Lessons from the Collapse of Archaeological Heritage Management in Spain Journal of Business Ethics. 

Cultural heritage
Methods in archaeology